At the 1951 Pan American Games a men's sport shooting competition was held. Events were held in Buenos Aires, Argentina at the Tiro Federal Argentino - Buenos Aires between 25 February and 3 March. There were several disciplines, including individual and team events.

Medal summary

Medal table

References

  .
 
 

1951
Shooting
Pan American Games
1951 Pan American Games